Glenn Joseph Frey (March 6, 1912 – January 5, 1980) was an American football quarterback and running back in the National Football League. He played for the Philadelphia Eagles. He played college football for the Temple Owls and coach Glenn "Pop" Warner.

Frey played in the first Sugar Bowl contest. January 1, 1935, at Tulane Stadium, New Orleans, Louisiana, in front of 22,206.

He graduated from Tunkhannock (Pennsylvania) High School in 1931.

References

1912 births
1980 deaths
American football quarterbacks
American football running backs
Philadelphia Eagles players
Temple Owls football players
Rowan Profs football coaches
People from New Port Richey, Florida
People from Tunkhannock, Pennsylvania